Exocytosis is infiltration of the epidermis by inflammatory or circulating blood cells.

See also
 Skin lesion
 Skin disease
 List of skin diseases

References

Dermatologic terminology